Lucien Fils Ibara (born 7 September 1974) is a Congolese footballer. He played in 22 matches for the Congo national football team from 1992 to 1999. He was also named in Congo's squad for the 2000 African Cup of Nations tournament.

References

1974 births
Living people
Republic of the Congo footballers
Republic of the Congo international footballers
2000 African Cup of Nations players
Place of birth missing (living people)
Association football defenders
VfB Wissen players
VfL Herzlake players
Republic of the Congo expatriate footballers
Republic of the Congo expatriate sportspeople in Germany
Expatriate footballers in Germany